The following is a list of notable people educated at St John's College, Cambridge. When available, years of attendance are provided as indicated in the College Register or in the Oxford Dictionary of National Biography. Over 1000 former members of St John's College appear in the Oxford Dictionary of National Biography.

Politics, military, and the civil service

United Kingdom
John Aislabie, Chancellor of the Exchequer, 1718–21
Prince Adolphus, Duke of Cambridge (honorary degree)
Roger Ascham, tutor of Elizabeth I and advisor to Edward VI and Mary I
Martin Bladen, Chief Secretary for Ireland, 1715–17
Lucius Cary, 2nd Viscount Falkland, Secretary of State, 1642–43
John Cheke, Secretary of State, 1553
Thomas Clarkson, abolitionist and a leading campaigner against the slave trade in the British Empire
John Duncombe, Chancellor of the Exchequer, 1672–76
Gilbert Elliot-Murray-Kynynmound, 2nd Earl of Minto, Lord Privy Seal, 1846–52, First Lord of the Admiralty, 1835–1841
Thomas de Grey, 2nd Earl de Grey, Lord Lieutenant of Ireland, 1841–44
Sir Percy James Grigg, Secretary of State for War, 1942–45
Henry Howard, 6th Duke of Norfolk, Earl Marshal, 1672–84
Sir William Molesworth, 8th Baronet, Secretary of State for the Colonies, 1855
Alfred Mond, 1st Baron Melchett, Minister of Health, 1921–22, Founder & Chairman of Imperial Chemical Industries
Francis North, 1st Baron Guilford, Lord Keeper, 1682–85
Fletcher Norton, 1st Baron Grantley, Speaker of the House of Commons, 1770–80
Matthew Prior, Chief Secretary for Ireland, 1697–99, poet, ambassador & secret agent who negotiated the Treaty Of Utrecht
Hugh Percy, 3rd Duke of Northumberland, Lord Lieutenant of Ireland, 1829–30, Chancellor of the University of Cambridge 1840–47
Dudley Ryder, 1st Earl of Harrowby, Secretary of State for Foreign Affairs, 1804-5
Richard Ryder, Home Secretary, 1809–12
Walter Montagu Douglas Scott, 5th Duke of Buccleuch, Lord Privy Seal, 1842–46
Robert Stewart, Viscount Castlereagh, Secretary of State for Foreign Affairs, 1812–22
Sarah Teather, Minister of State for Children and Families, 2010–12
Thomas Thynne, 1st Marquess of Bath, Secretary of State, 1768–70 & 1775–79 (South), 1768 & 1779 (North)
Richard Trench, 2nd Earl of Clancarty, British Ambassador to the Netherlands, 1813–23, President of the Board of Trade, 1812–18
James Vernon, Secretary of State 1697–1700 (North) and 1700–02 (South)
Edward Villiers, 1st Earl of Jersey, Secretary of State 1699–1700 (South)
George Villiers, 4th Earl of Clarendon, Secretary of State for Foreign Affairs, 1853–58, 1865–66, 1868–70
Thomas Wentworth, 1st Earl of Strafford, leading advisor to Charles I, Lord Lieutenant of Ireland, 1633–41
William Wilberforce, Member of Parliament and a leader of the movement to abolish the slave trade
Fred Willey, Minister of State for Housing and Local Government, 1964–70
Prince William, Duke of Cambridge (affiliated)
Charles Philip Yorke, Home Secretary, 1803–04, First Lord of the Admiralty, 1810–12

Current Members of Parliament
Richard Burgon
Robert Jenrick, Minister of State for Immigration, 2022–present

Current Members of the House of Lords
John Browne
Charles Courtenay, 19th Earl of Devon
Nigel Crisp
Nigel Dodds
Peter Hennessy
David Hope
Mervyn King
Colin Renfrew
David Rowe-Beddoe
Larry Whitty

Lord High Treasurers
Robert Cecil, 1st Earl of Salisbury, Lord High Treasurer, 1608–12
William Cecil, 1st Baron Burghley, Lord High Treasurer, 1572–98
Thomas Howard, 1st Earl of Suffolk, Lord High Treasurer, 1614–18
Thomas Sackville, 1st Earl of Dorset, Lord High Treasurer, 1599–1608
Thomas Wriothesley, 4th Earl of Southampton, Lord High Treasurer, 1660–67

Prime Ministers
George Hamilton-Gordon, 4th Earl of Aberdeen, Prime Minister of the United Kingdom, 1852–55
F. J. Robinson, 1st Viscount Goderich, Prime Minister of the United Kingdom, 1827–28
Henry John Temple, 3rd Viscount Palmerston, Prime Minister of the United Kingdom, 1855–58 & 1859–65
Charles Watson-Wentworth, 2nd Marquess of Rockingham (briefly admitted), Prime Minister of Great Britain, 1765–66 & 1782

Colonial Administrators and Diplomats
Sir Thomas Bendish, 2nd Baronet, British Ambassador to the Ottoman Empire, 1647–55
Henry Brind, British Ambassador to Somalia, 1977–80, High Commissioner to Malawi, 1983–87
Sir Bryan Cartledge, British Ambassador to the USSR, 1985–88
Peter Collecott, British Ambassador to Brazil, 2004–08
Walter Coutts, Governor of Uganda, 1961–63
John Cradock, 1st Baron Howden, Governor of the Cape Colony, 1811–14
Sir Percy Cradock, British Ambassador to the People's Republic of China, 1978–83
Alleyne FitzHerbert, 1st Baron St Helens, British ambassador to Russia, 1783–87 & 1801–02
Hugh Foot, Baron Caradon, Governor of Cyprus, 1957–60, British Permanent Representative to the United Nations, 1964–70
Harry Edward Spiller Cordeaux, Governor of Saint Helena, 1912–20, and Governor of Uganda, 1910–11
Thomas Gibson-Carmichael, 1st Baron Carmichael, Governor of Victoria, 1908–11
Christopher Ingham, British Ambassador to Uzbekistan, 1999-2002
Edward Law, 1st Earl of Ellenborough, Governor-General of India, 1842–44
John Margetson, British Ambassador to Vietnam, 1978–80, Ambassador to the Netherlands 1984–88
Sir Robin McLaren, British Ambassador to the People's Republic of China, 1991–94
 James Broom Millar – first Director General of the Ghana Broadcasting Corporation (1954–1960)
Sir James Peiris, Governor of Ceylon, 1929
Richard Penn, Lieutenant Governor of Pennsylvania, 1771–73
Sir Richard Posnett, Governor of Belize, 1972–76, Governor of Bermuda 1981–83
Sir Andrew Ridgway, Lieutenant Governor of Jersey, 2006–11
John Vernon Rob, 1st British High Commissioner to Singapore, 1965–67
Sir Fraser Russell, Governor of Southern Rhodesia, 1934–35, 1942, and 1946
Sir Philip Thomas, British High Commissioner to Nigeria, 2001–04, Consul-General in New York, 2004–07

Military
William Cavendish, 1st Duke of Newcastle, General and major supporter of Charles I in the English Civil War
Thomas Fairfax, 3rd Lord Fairfax of Cameron, General and parliamentary commander-in-chief in the English Civil War
Wilmot Fawkes, Admiral
Sir Roger Palin, Air Chief Marshal
Algernon Percy, 4th Duke of Northumberland, Admiral, First Lord of the Admiralty, 1852
Algernon Percy, 10th Earl of Northumberland, Admiral of the Fleet, Lord High Admiral, 1638–43
Hugh Percy, 2nd Duke of Northumberland, General during the American Revolutionary War
Edmund Phipps, General
Hugh Rose, 1st Baron Strathnairn, Field Marshal
Edward Russell, 1st Earl of Orford, Admiral of the Fleet, First Lord of the Admiralty, 1694–99, 1709–10, and 1714–17
Sir Thomas Snow, Lieutenant-General during WWI
George Townshend, 1st Marquess Townshend, Field Marshal, Lord Lieutenant of Ireland, 1767–72

International
Sir James Allen, Minister of Finance (New Zealand), 1912–15
Fra' Matthew Festing, Prince and Grand Master of the Sovereign Military Order of Malta, 2008–17
Yoshirō Fujimura, 2nd Baron Fujimura, Minister of Communications (Japan), 1924, Director of Mitsui & Co.
Akhter Husain, Governor of West Pakistan, 1957–60
Abul Hassan Isphani, Ambassador to the United States (Pakistan), 1948–52
Kenchō Suematsu, 1st Viscount Suematsu, Minister of Home Affairs (Japan), 1900–01, Minister of Communications, 1898
Nawab Mohammad Ismail Khan, President of the All-India Muslim League, 1930–47
Geoffrey Onyeama, Minister of Foreign Affairs (Nigeria), 2015–present
Sir R. P. Paranjpe, High Commissioner to Australia (India), 1944–47
Lim Chuan Poh, Chief of Defence Force (Singapore), 2000–03
Sir Henry Lee Hau Shik, Finance Minister of Malaysia, 1957–59
Makoto Taniguchi, Permanent Representative of Japan to the United Nations, 1986–89, Chairman of UNICEF, 1988
Edward Ronald Walker, Permanent Representative of Australia to the United Nations, 1956–59

Prime Ministers
Sir Francis Bell, Prime Minister of New Zealand, 1925
Alfred Domett, Prime Minister of New Zealand, 1862–63
Manmohan Singh, Prime Minister of India, 2004–2014

Justice

Edmund Anderson, Chief Justice of the Common Pleas, 1583–1605
Stanley Berwin, one of the leading lawyers of the second half of the 20th century
Robert Booth, Lord Chief Justice of Ireland, 1679–80
Sir Codrington Edmund Carrington, 1st Chief Justice of Ceylon, 1801–06
E. C. Clark, Regius Professor of Civil Law, 1854–58
Thomas Denman, 1st Baron Denman, Lord Chief Justice of England, 1832–50
Asaf Ali Asghar Fyzee (1899–1981), advocate in Bombay High Court, 1st Indian ambassador to Egypt
Edward Marshall Hall, Victorian era barrister known as "The Great Defender"
Robert Heath, Lord Chief Justice of England, 1642–45
Ahmad Mohamed Ibrahim, 1st Attorney-General of Singapore, 1965–67
Donald Kingdon, Chief Justice of Nigeria, 1929–46
William Martin, Chief Justice of New Zealand, 1841–57
G. M. Paterson, Attorney General of Ghana, 1956–57
Maharaj Nagendra Singh, President of the International Court of Justice, 1985–88
John Smalman Smith, Chief Justice of Lagos (Nigeria), 1889–95 
Wee Chong Jin, Chief Justice of Singapore, 1963–90
Glanville Williams, Q.C. LL.D. F.B.A. described in 1997 by the New York Times as the greatest lawyer of the 20th century
Humphrey Winch, Lord Chief Justice of Ireland, 1608–11
Walter Woon, Attorney-General of Singapore, 2008–10

Science, mathematics, and technology

Frank H. Berkshire, Principal Teaching Fellow in Fluid Dynamics at Imperial College London
Chris Abel, Professor of Biological Chemistry at Cambridge
Bernard Armitage, fellow of the College and psychiatrist 
George Barnard, statistician known for his work on the foundations of statistics
Frederic Bartlett, psychologist
William Bateson, biologist
Jagdish Bhagwati, economist
Henry Briggs, mathematician
William Burnside, mathematician
Sir David Cox, prominent statistician
Sir Samuel Curran, physicist, inventor of the scintillation counter and proportional counter, and founder of Strathclyde University
George Darwin, astronomer
John Dee, mathematician, astronomer, astrologer, geographer, and consultant to Queen Elizabeth I
Eric Denton, marine biologist
Fearon Fallows, astronomer
Thomas Fink, physicist and author
John Ambrose Fleming, electrical engineer
Steve Furber, computer scientist
William Gilbert, physician and natural philosopher, discoverer of the Earth's magnetic field and inventor of the word 'electricity'
Johannes de Villiers Graaff, economist
William Gregor, discoverer of titanium
William D. Hamilton, evolutionary biologist who formalised the concept of kin selection
Douglas Hartree, mathematician
David Harvey, Marxist geographer, social scientist
William Heberden, British physician, gave the first clinical description (1768) of angina pectoris and demonstrated that chicken pox was different from smallpox
John Herschel, prominent mathematician and astronomer who coined the word "photography"
W. E. Hick, pioneer of cognitive science and discoverer of Hick's law
Robert Hinde, Professor of Zoology, and former Master of St. John's
William George Horner, mathematician
Sir Fred Hoyle, pioneering but controversial cosmologist who first used the term 'Big Bang'
James Jago, scientist and physician
Sir Harold Jeffreys, applied mathematician and geophysicist
Joseph Larmor, mathematician and physicist
Louis Leakey, archaeologist and naturalist credited with the discovery of Homo habilis
John Marrack, immunologist
Alfred Marshall, economist
William McDougall, psychologist
James McKeen Cattell, psychologist
Louis J. Mordell, mathematician
Seymour Papert, computer scientist
Sir Charles Algernon Parsons, inventor of the steam turbine
Rudolf Peierls, physicist
Sir Roger Penrose, mathematical physicist and philosopher
Cedric Price, architect
Richard A. Proctor, astronomer
Richard Samworth, statistician
Vikram Sarabhai, father of the Indian space programme
Edmund Sharpe, architect
David Stoddart OBE, biogeographer
James Joseph Sylvester, mathematician
Brook Taylor, mathematician
William West Jr, botanist
George Stephen West, Hutchinson research student, botanist
Sir Maurice Wilkes, one of the founding fathers of modern computer science, and inventor of the first stored program digital computer
John Tuzo Wilson, geophysicist and geologist who achieved worldwide acclaim for his contributions to the theory of plate tectonics

Nobel Prize winners

Sir Edward Appleton, winner of the Nobel prize for Physics, for discovering the Appleton layer
Max Born (affiliated), Nobel laureate in Physics
Sir John Cockcroft, Nobel prize-winning physicist who first split the atom
Allan Cormack, Nobel laureate in Medicine or Physiology for the invention of the CAT scan
Paul Dirac, Nobel laureate in Physics and one of the founders of Quantum Mechanics
Sir Nevill Francis Mott, awarded Nobel prize for Physics for work on the behaviour of electrons in magnetic solids
Abdus Salam, Nobel laureate in Physics, for unifying the electromagnetic force and the weak force
Frederick Sanger, molecular biologist and one of only four double Nobel Prize winners
Maurice Wilkins, awarded Nobel prize for Medicine or Physiology with Watson and Crick for discovering the structure of DNA
Eric Maskin, Prize in Economic Sciences in Memory of Alfred Nobel, "for having laid the foundations of mechanism design theory"
 Roger Penrose, Nobel Prize in Physics, "for the discovery that black hole formation is a robust prediction of the general theory of relativity"

Royal Medal winners
Three Royal Medals, known also as the Queen's Medals, are awarded annually by the Sovereign upon the recommendation of the Council of the Royal Society, "two for the most important contributions to the advancement of Natural Knowledge (one in the physical and one in the biological sciences) and the other for distinguished contributions in the applied sciences". The first Royal Medal was awarded in 1826 and previous recipients include thirty-eight Johnians.

Arts, sports and literature

Douglas Adams, author
Rob Andrew, England rugby footballer
John Andrews, crime and antiques writer
Jamie Bamber, actor
Sir Cecil Beaton, renowned photographer, Academy Award winner, and one of the Bright Young Things
Rodney Bennett, television director
Chris Brasher, Olympic gold medallist runner, founder of the London Marathon
Mike Brearley, cricketer, England Captain
Patrick Brontë, father of the Brontë sisters
Samuel Butler, author
Sir Hugh Casson, president of the Royal Academy of Arts, 1974–84
Sir John Clements, actor and theatrical producer
Emma Corrin, actress
Jin Yong, Chinese novelist and newspaper editor
Paul Dempsey, TV presenter
Hugh Dennis, actor, comedian
Jimmy Edwards, comedy actor
Jennifer Egan, author, winner of 2011 Pulitzer Prize for fiction
James Ogilvie Fairlie, Scottish landowner, known as the 'Father of the Open Championship'
John Gardner, author
Andrew Gilligan, controversial journalist
Robert Greene, arguably the first professional English author of plays, poems and novels
Tony Hendra, actor, comedian
Sir Derek Jacobi, actor
Logie Bruce Lockhart, Scotland rugby footballer
Ben Macintyre, author and journalist
Jonathan Miller, physician, theatre and opera director, television presenter
Thomas Nashe, pamphleteer, satirist and playwright
Frederic Raphael, screenwriter, novelist and journalist, received Academy Award for Best Original Screenplay, 1965
Piers Paul Read, novelist and historian
Paul Ritter, actor
Sir Charles Aubrey Smith, cricket player and prominent 1930's Hollywood actor
Tom Rob Smith, award nominee author of Soviet-era novels; erstwhile writer for Channel 5's defunct soap opera Family Affairs
Robert Stevenson, nominated for Academy Award for Best Director, 1964
Paul Sussman, author, archaeologist and journalist
James St Clair Wade, Architect
Sid Waddell, darts commentator
Peter Warfield, England rugby player
Henry Wriothesley, 3rd Earl of Southampton, patron of William Shakespeare

Poets
William Barnes, poet
Richard Eberhart, poet, winner of 1966 Pulitzer Prize for poetry, United States Poet Laureate, 1969-61
Robert Herrick, author of renowned poem "To the Virgins, to Make Much of Time"
Ben Jonson (statutably admitted), poet
Edward de Vere, 17th Earl of Oxford, courtier and poet, subject of the Oxfordian theory of Shakespeare authorship 
William Wordsworth, major English Romantic poet and Poet Laureate of the United Kingdom, 1843–50
Thomas Wyatt, courtier and poet

Musicians
William Sterndale Bennett, 19th-century composer
Andrew Carwood, Director of Music St Paul's Cathedral (2007), tenor and conductor
Christopher Gabbitas, singer
Andrew Gant, chorister and composer
Harry Gregson-Williams, film score composer and Golden Globe nominee 
Rupert Gregson-Williams, film score composer and recipient of the European Film composer award
George Guest, Welsh choral conductor, college organist 1951–91
Herbert Howells, English composer, college organist
Geoffrey Paterson, conductor, college organist
John Scott, LVO, English organist, organ scholar 1974–78, organist of St Paul's 1990–2004

Academics, philosophers, and explorers

Gregory Bateson, anthropologist
Owen Chadwick, church historian, Vice-Chancellor of the University of Cambridge, 1969–71
Baron Kikuchi Dairoku, Japanese Minister of Education, 1901-3, President of Tokyo University, 1898-01
Erasmus Darwin, key thinker of the Midlands Enlightenment and founding member of the Lunar Society of Birmingham
 John Gordon Dower, architect and leading light to create the National Parks of England and Wales
Livingston Farrand, President of Cornell University, 1921–37
Sir Vivian Fuchs, President of the Royal Geographical Society, completed the first overland crossing of Antarctica
Charles Sydney Gibbes, English tutor of Tsarevich Alexei Nikolaevich of Russia
Andrew D. Hamilton, Vice-Chancellor of the University of Oxford, 2009–15, President of New York University, 2016–
William Richard Hamilton, President of the Royal Geographical Society
Peter Hennessy, English historian of government
John Stevens Henslow  English clergyman, botanist and geologist
Thomas Hobbes, philosopher
Edward Latymer, founder of Latymer Upper School and The Latymer School
Sir Donald MacAlister, 1st Baronet, physician and chancellor of the University of Glasgow
Richard Cockburn Maclaurin, President of the Massachusetts Institute of Technology, 1909–20
Victor Alessandro Mundella, physicist and Principal of Sunderland Technical College
E. J. Rapson, numismatist and professor of Sanskrit (1906–36) at the University of Cambridge
W. H. R. Rivers, anthropologist
Sir Humphry Davy Rolleston, 1st Baronet, President of the Royal College of Physicians, 1922–25
Max Rosenheim, President of the Royal College of Physicians, 1966–71
Grafton Elliot Smith, Egyptologist and anthropologist
Stephen Sykes, theologian, former Dean of St John's and Bishop of Ely, and principal of St John's College, Durham
Frank Thistlethwaite, Vice-Chancellor of the University of East Anglia (1961–1980)
Sir Thomas Watson, 1st Baronet, President of the Royal College of Physicians, 1862–66
 Peter Whelan (lawyer), Professor of Law
Anthony Wolf
Sir James Wordie, President of the Royal Geographical Society, helped plan the first successful ascent of Mount Everest

Religion

Thomas Carter, Puritan minister in the Massachusetts Bay Colony and signatory of the Dedham Covenant
William Cassels, missionary and member of the Cambridge Seven
D'Ewes Coke, clergyman and colliery master
John Colenso, Bishop of Natal, 1853–83
Henry Martyn, missionary to India and Persia
William Morgan, Bishop of Llandaff and Bishop of St Asaph; Welsh Bible translator
Titus Oates, chaplain who fabricated the "Popish Plot"
Edward Stillingfleet, British theologian and scholar

Roman Catholic cardinals, saints and martyrs
William Andleby, martyr
Saint John Fisher (Fellow and Founder), martyr and cardinal
Saint Richard Gwyn, martyr
Saint Philip Howard, 20th Earl of Arundel, martyr
Philip Howard, cardinal
William Howard, 1st Viscount Stafford, martyr

Anglican archbishops
Richard Boyle, Archbishop of Tuam, 1638–45
Peter Carnley, Primate of Australia 2000–05, Archbishop of Perth 1981–2005
Lowther Clarke, Archbishop of Melbourne, 1905–20
Donald Coggan, Archbishop of Canterbury, 1974–1980
John Cradock, Archbishop of Dublin, 1772–78
Harrington Lees, Archbishop of Melbourne, 1921–29
Richard Neile, Archbishop of York, 1631–40
Edwin Sandys, Archbishop of York, 1577–88
George Selwyn, Primate and 1st bishop of New Zealand, 1841–67
Gerald Sharp, Archbishop of Brisbane, 1921–33
William Stuart, Archbishop of Armagh, 1800–22
John Williams, Archbishop of York, 1641–50, Lord Keeper of the Great Seal, 1621–25

Business
John Browne, Baron Browne of Madingley, CEO of BP, 1995–2007
Damon Buffini, former head of private equity firm Permira
Mike Clasper, chairman of Coats Group, 2013–present
Charles Corfield, founder of Frame Technology Corporation
Mark Coombs, billionaire and CEO of Ashmore Group
Gavyn Davies, multi-millionaire and former Goldman Sachs partner, chairman of BBC, 2001–04
Sir Harpal Kumar, CEO of Cancer Research UK, 2007–18
Dame Louise Makin, CEO of BTG plc, 2004–present
Sir Mark Moody-Stuart, chairman of Royal Dutch Shell, 1998–2001
Richard Reed, Adam Balon and Jon Wright, co-founders of Innocent Drinks
Thomas Sutton, founder of Charterhouse School and one of 16th-century England's wealthiest individuals
Hon. John Tayloe III, planter and one of the wealthiest men in America in the early 19th century
Kenneth Thomson, 2nd Baron Thomson of Fleet, ninth richest man in the world upon his death in 2006
Eben Upton, CEO of  Raspberry Pi Ltd.
Charles Woodburn, CEO of BAE Systems, 2017–present

References

St John's College, Cambridge
Alumni of St John's College, Cambridge
St John's